Predictive learning is a technique of machine learning in which an agent tries to build a model of its environment by trying out different actions in various circumstances. It uses knowledge of the effects its actions appear to have, turning them into planning operators. These allow the agent to act purposefully in its world. Predictive learning is one attempt to learn with a minimum of pre-existing mental structure. It may have been inspired by Piaget's account of how children construct knowledge of the world by interacting with it. Gary Drescher's book 'Made-up Minds' was seminal for the area. 

The idea that predictions and Unconscious inference are used by the brain to construct a model of the world, in which it can identify causes of percepts, is however even older and goes at least back to Hermann von Helmholtz. Those ideas were later picked up in the field of Predictive coding.

Another related predictive learning theory is Jeff Hawkins' memory-prediction framework, which is laid out in his On Intelligence.

See also 
 Reinforcement learning
 Predictive coding

References 

Machine learning